James LaRue may refer to:
 Jim LaRue, American football player and coach
 James LaRue (sound engineer), American sound engineer
 J. B. Larue (James Buskirk Larue), California businessman and politician